"Random" is the first CD single from UK hip hop artist Lady Sovereign, following the release of her 12" vinyl single "Ch Ching (Cheque 1 2)" in 2004. It was her second and last single for Casual Records in 2005.

The single was Lady Sovereign's first to make the UK top 75, peaking at #73 there and spending one week within the top 75. After the single release, she was signed by Def Jam Recordings and this single is considered to be her breakthrough into the mainstream market.

"Random" was featured on an episode of The O.C. aired on April 27, 2006, playing in the background during the senior prom in Season 3, Episode 23 - "The Party Favor" and was featured as a track on Midnight Club 3: DUB Edition Remix. A remix of this song was played on the "Jamalot" episode of CSI: NY.

The first rapped line in the song references the hit song "Tipsy" by J-Kwon.

Track listing
The Remixes - 12" Promo single
 A1 "Random" (Menta Remix feat. Riko) 
 A2 "Random" (Menta Instrumental)
 B1 "Random" (A. Rucker & Sinden Vocal Mix) 
 B2 "Random" (A. Rucker & Sinden Instrumental)
 B3 "Random" (Menta Accapella feat. Riko)

12" single
 A1 "Random" (Original Mix) 
 A2 "Random" (Instrumental) 
 B3 "Random" (Accapella)
 B1 "Random" (Menta Remix feat. Riko) 
 B2 "Random" (A. Rucker & Sinden Remix)

CD single
"Random" (Original Radio Edit) - 3:39
"Random" (Menta Remix feat. Riko) - 4:57
"Random" (A. Brucker & Sinden Remix) - 3:50
Video #1
Video #2

Digital EP
"Random" (Menta Remix) - 5:01
"Random" - 3:46
"Random" (A. Brucker & Sinden Vocal Mix) - 3:49

2004 songs
2005 singles
Lady Sovereign songs
Songs written by Lady Sovereign